Hibbertia squarrosa is a species of flowering plant in the family Dilleniaceae and is endemic to the west of Western Australia. It is an erect shrub with linear leaves and yellow flowers with twenty stamens arranged around five glabrous carpels.

Description
Flowering mainly occurs from September to November.

Taxonomy
Hibbertia squarrosa was first formally described in 2018 by Kevin Thiele in the journal Nuytsia from specimens collected near the Coorow-Green Head Road in 2016. The specific epithet (squarrosa) means "rough with stiff scales", referring to the sepals.

Distribution and habitat
This species grows in shrubland and has mainly been recorded from the area between Dongara and Cataby in the Geraldton Sandplains bioregion in the west of Western Australia.

Conservation status
Hibbertia squarrosa is classified as "not threatened" by the Government of Western Australia Department of Biodiversity, Conservation and Attractions.

See also
List of Hibbertia species

References

squarrosa
Flora of Western Australia
Plants described in 2018
Taxa named by Kevin Thiele